Garfunkel and Oates is an American comedy television series created by and starring Riki Lindhome and Kate Micucci, members of the titular musical duo. The series aired from August 7 through September 25, 2014, on IFC. On March 3, 2015, IFC decided not to renew the series for a second season.

Plot
The series follows the personal and professional lives of the comedy folk duo Riki "Garfunkel" Lindhome and Kate "Oates" Micucci, as they attempt to make it big in Hollywood one satirical song at a time.

Cast
 Riki Lindhome as Riki "Garfunkel" Lindhome
 Kate Micucci as Kate "Oates" Micucci

Recurring
 Natasha Leggero as Vivian St. Charles
 Busy Philipps as Karen
 Sarah Burns as Cheryl Johnson
 Artemis Pebdani as Janice

Development and production
On January 13, 2011, Garfunkel and Oates signed a deal with HBO for a pilot for a series loosely based on their lives. Lindhome has described it as "Glee with dick jokes". Shortly afterward, HBO passed on the series. In August 2012, HBO posted webisodes on their website.

On April 10, 2013, IFC ordered their own pilot for Garfunkel and Oates, as part of the scripted development slate. On September 30, 2013, IFC officially placed an eight-episode series order on the series, executive produced by Jonathan Stern and Abominable Pictures. A few months later, Fred Savage signed on to executive produce and direct all season one episodes.

On June 2, 2014, IFC announced the series premiere date of August 7, 2014, at 10 pm ET/PT. IFC released the third episode online a week before the series premiere.

On March 3, 2015, IFC announced that the series was canceled after one season. In an interview, Riki Lindhome stated that the network "wanted to do another season but they needed it out by a certain date", which Lindhome could not meet due to commitments for another show on Comedy Central.

Episodes

Reception
The series received mostly positive reviews from television critics. On Metacritic, the first season was given a rating of 73 out of 100, indicating "generally favorable reviews". Rob Owen of the Pittsburgh Post-Gazette described the series as "a gem of a little show." Writing for the Los Angeles Times, Robert Lloyd noted that the first episode "is the weakest of the three I've seen," but "Things quickly improve, however, as the women get stranger and more idiosyncratic." Caroline Framke of The A.V. Club awarded the series with a "B−" grade, stating that the series was "promising" but also "struggling to find itself". She also picked up on the comparisons to Flight of the Conchords, noting that "both shows feature hapless heroes and smash cuts to surrealist musical interruptions. While Flight of the Conchords took pride in maintaining a quizzical distance from the audience, Garfunkel and Oates tries to bring us right into Lindhome and Micucci's world alongside them." Mike Hale of The New York Times compared the series to The Mary Tyler Moore Show, stating that "the Mary Tyler Moore connection is clear, and the desirable Riki and second banana Kate have a slight Mary-Rhoda correlation."

References

External links
 
 

2010s American musical comedy television series
2010s American single-camera sitcoms
2010s American sketch comedy television series
2014 American television series debuts
2014 American television series endings
English-language television shows
IFC (American TV channel) original programming
Television duos
Television series about actors
Television series based on singers and musicians